Pablo Marín may refer to:
Pablo Antón Marín Estrada, Spanish writer
Pablo Marín (footballer, born 1965), Ecuadorian footballer
Pablo Marín (footballer, born 2003), Spanish footballer
Pablo Marin, Belizean politician

See also
Pablo Marí, Spanish footballer